Yoes Rizal (born in Palembang) rise in Jakarta is an Indonesian contemporary artist painter. He graduated in 1985 from Art & Design at the  Institut Teknologi Bandung (ITB), under Indonesian  Prof. Muchtar Apin,  prof. Kaboel Soeadi,  Prof. Ahmad Sadali, Dr  Sanento Yuliman, Umi Dachlan and Joan Sommers, American artist and master of Sumi-e (North Carolina).

Yoes Rizal is an Abstract expressionist painter.

Yoes rejects the notion that art artwork can be explained in relation to a single message or story, believing such explanations to be posturing: “My work is not final, that’s the problem. The idea is not ending at this size. It has to be continued, it’s a process,” Yoes Rizal's humanist and intuitive-reflective nature lends real depth to his treatment of the human figure and the way human interactions are depicted. We encounter here statements of universal power about the human condition.

Bibliography

Selected solo exhibition

 2019, with Teufik Hadzalic, Serbian Writer & Artist Association and Adligat Society, Belgrade, Serbia
 2019, Vilaka Museum, Latvia
  2018, Pop-up/Meletup Indonesian Nasional Gallery 
 2016, Reflection, art exhibition. Rumah Kreatif Fadli Zon, Cimanggis-Depok.
 2013, Beyond life, Galeri 2 TIM, Jakarta.
 2011, Cemara 6 galeri, Jakarta.  
 2006, Pi Gallery, Kansas City, USA
 2007, Side Street Gallery, North Carolina, USA
 2005, Pauline Art Space, Jakarta, Indonesia
 2004, Galeri Milenium, Jakarta, Indonesia
 2002, “Emerging Bodies Part II”, Jakarta Arts Council/TIM, Jakarta, Indonesia
 2000, Red Mills Gallery, Vermont, USA
 2000, “Emerging Bodies”, Jakarta Arts Council/TIM, Jakarta,  Indonesia
 1997, Solo exhibition Hilton Club.
 1997, Charity show, Aston hotel, Jakarta, Indonesia

Awards & Residency .

2019, Mark Rothko Center-Valdis Buss residency program, Vilaka-Daugavpils, Latvia.
2006-2007 Richard Snyder studio, New York, USA. 
2006, Joan Sommers studio, North Carolina, USA. 
2007, Jody Wilkins space, Kansas City, USA. 
2000, Andrew Jen space, Los Angeles, USA. 
2000, Brian St. Cyr, New York, USA.
2000, Asian artist fellows, Vermont Studio Center, sponsored by Freeman Foundation Asian artist Fellowship, USA. 2000, Boston, Massachusetts.
1999, 4th International Ipoh Art Fair Festival, Malaysia. 
1999, Certificate Recognition, Philip Morris Asia Limited.
1995, Sanyu Corp, Nagoya, Japan.
1984, International Art &Fashion competition, Paris American Academy. 
1984, International Graphic arts competition, TUTAV, Turkey Tourism Board.

Selected group exhibitions.  
2015, 2016, 2017, 2018, annually Celebrate Indonesia Independence day, House of Representative Hall, Jakarta.
2014, Rendering Regime, The Jakarta Arts Center, Jakarta. 
2012, ArtEnergy, National gallery, Jakarta.
2012, Across Generations, Southeast Asian Artists show at MH gallery, New York city. 
2012, Sketsa Jakarta, Bentara Budaya gallery, Jakarta. 
2010 Jakarta artists group “Detergent”,the Jakarta Arts Council/TIM, Jakarta.
2010, group show, Grand Kemang, Jakarta. 
2007, “Warna Indonesia”, galeri Tee Huis, Bandung.
2004, “Intimate”, Darmawangsa Town Square, Jakarta. 
2001, “Interupsi, Galeri Mileninium, Jakarta. 
2001, Pameran Pelukis Jakarta, Jakarta Arts Council/TIM, Jakarta. 
1999, ”Phenomena of Urban Society”, Galeri Milenium, Jakarta. 
1999, 4th International Ipoh arts Fair Festival, Malaysia. 
1999, Indonesia Art Award & Philip Morris Asia, National Gallery, Jakarta. 
1999, “German and Indonesian Expression” with Anke Malmval, galeri Milenium, Jakarta. 
1999, “Duo artists”, German Center, Serpong Café Waroeng Kemang, Jakarta. 
1998, Bebek Bali resto, Jakarta. 
1998, Pameran Pelukis Jakarta Arts Council/TIM, Jakarta. 
1994, “Untitled „94”, Hilton Club, Jakarta. 
1993, “4 artists”, Enteos Club, BRI tower Jakarta.
1992, “3 Faces”, gedung YPK Bandung. 
1985, International Art &Fashion Show, Paris American Academy. 
1985, “Turkey in my mind”, TUTAV, Turkey. 
1985, “ 4 Art Students”, Centre Culturel Francais, Bandung. 
1982, “7 Art Students”, Centre Culturel Francais, Bandung

References

 http://www.visitvilaka.lv/ko-redzet-un-darit/kultura-un-tradicijas/valdis-buss-starptautiskais-makslas-pleners/

 http://galeri-nasional.or.id/en/newss/434-pameran_lukisan_yoes_rizal__popupmeletup

 https://majalah.tempo.co/read/seni/154966/letupan-ala-yoes

 https://www.thejakartapost.com/news/2018/02/20/yoes-rizal-keeping-art-art-and-nothing-more.html

21st-century Indonesian painters
1956 births
Living people
Bandung Institute of Technology alumni
People from Palembang